Cyclosia pieridoides, the False Idea Moth, is a moth in the family Zygaenidae. It was described by Francis Walker in 1862. It is found in Asia.

Members of the nominate subspecies mimic members of the genus Idea and Ideopsis gaura. Members of the subspecies C. pieridoides binghami mimic members of the genus Delias.

Subspecies
Cyclosia pieridoides bangkana Hering, 1922 (Bangka)
Cyclosia pieridoides belitungensis Kishida&Endo, 1999 (Belitung)
Cyclosia pieridoides binghami Butler, 1882 (Indochina)
Cyclosia pieridoides glauca Walker, 1856 (Sumatra, Mentawai)
Cyclosia pieridoides hestinoides Walker, 1862 (Borneo)
Cyclosia pieridoides labuana Hering, 1922 (Labuan)
Cyclosia pieridoides pieriodes (Borneo)
Cyclosia pieridoides subflava Moore, 1879 (Malakka)
Cyclosia pieridoides sumatraensis Talbot, 1929 (Sumatra)
Cyclosia pieridoides transitaria Hering, 1922 (Java)
Cyclosia pieridoides virgo Jordan, 1907 (Peninsular Malaysia)

References

Moths described in 1862
Chalcosiinae